Bean's Purchase is a township in Coös County, New Hampshire, United States. The purchase lies entirely within the White Mountain National Forest. The population was zero as of the 2020 census.

In New Hampshire, locations, grants, townships (which are different from towns), and purchases are unincorporated portions of a county which are not part of any town and have limited self-government (if any, as many are uninhabited).

History
In 1851 the New Hampshire state legislature authorized the governor and council to appoint a land commissioner to sell the public lands, and James Willey of Conway was appointed to that office.

Geography
The center of the purchase is within the valley of the Wild River, with a large portion of it within the Wild River Wilderness. The western side of the purchase is dominated by the ridgeline of Wildcat Mountain, the Carter mountains, and Mount Moriah. The Appalachian Trail crosses the purchase, following the crest of the Wildcat-Carter-Moriah ridge. The west side of the ridgeline drains to the Peabody River. The Peabody and Wild rivers are both northeast-flowing tributaries of the Androscoggin River. The summits of North Baldface, Mount Meader, and West Royce form a line along the eastern edge of Bean's Purchase, and the eastern slopes of those mountains are part of the Saco River watershed.

Demographics

As of the 2020 census, the population of the township was zero. Bean's Purchase is part of the Berlin, NH–VT Micropolitan Statistical Area.

References

Townships in Coös County, New Hampshire
Berlin, New Hampshire micropolitan area
Townships in New Hampshire